The Stakhanovite movement was a mass cultural movement of workers which originated in the Soviet Union, and encouraged socialist emulation and rationalization of workplace processes. The Stakhanovites modeled themselves after Alexei Stakhanov and took pride in their ability to produce more than was required by working harder and more efficiently, thus contributing to the common good and strengthening the socialist state. The movement began in the coal industry but later spread to many other industries in the Soviet Union. Initially popular, it eventually encountered resistance as the increased productivity led to increased demands on workers.

History 

The Stakhanovite movement began during the Soviet second five-year plan in 1935 as a new stage of socialist competition, emerging as a continuation of the rapid industrialization and forced collectivization that had transpired seven years prior. The movement took its name from Aleksei Grigorievich Stakhanov, who reportedly mined 102 tons of coal in less than 6 hours (14 times his quota) on 31 August 1935. However, Stakhanovite followers would soon "break" his record. On February 1, 1936, it was reported that Nikita Izotov had mined 640 tons of coal in a single shift.

The Stakhanovite movement, supported and led by the Communist Party, soon spread over other industries of the Soviet Union.

On November 14–17, 1935, the 1st All-Union Stakhanovite Conference took place at the Kremlin. The conference emphasized the outstanding role of the Stakhanovite movement in the socialist reconstruction of the national economy. In December 1935 the plenum of the Communist Party's Central Committee specifically discussed aspects of developing industry and transport systems in light of the Stakhanovite movement.

In accordance with the decisions of the plenum, the Soviets organized a wide network of industrial training and created special courses for foremen of socialist labor. In 1936 a number of industrial and technical conferences revised the projected production capacities of different industries and increased their outputs. They also introduced Stakhanovite contests in many industries to find the best workers and encourage competition between them.

Female Stakhanovites emerged more seldom than male ones, but a quarter of all trade-union women were designated as "norm-breaking". A preponderance of rural Stakhanovites were women, working as milkmaids, calf tenders, and fieldworkers.

The Soviet authorities claimed that the Stakhanovite movement had caused a significant increase in labor productivity. It was reported that during the first five-year plan (1928–32) industrial labor productivity increased by 41%. During the second five-year plan (1933–1937) it reportedly increased by 82%. The discussion of the draft constitution in the 1930s was used to encourage a second wind for the movement.

During World War II the Stakhanovites used different methods to increase productivity, such as working several machine-tools at a time and combining professions.

Opposition and termination 
Opposition to the movement merited the label of "wrecker". Not all workers were excited about the Stakhanovites and the demand for increased productivity. Some groups held Stakhanov responsible for making their lives harder and even threatened him for it.

During the era of de-Stalinization, which sought to undo much of what was done during Stalin's régime, the Stakhanovite movement was declared a Stalinist propaganda maneuver; workers would receive the best equipment and most favorable conditions so that the best results could be achieved. After Stalin's death in March 1953 'brigades of socialist labor' replaced 'Stakhanovism'.

In 1988 the Soviet newspaper Komsomolskaya Pravda stated that the widely propagandized personal achievements of Stakhanov were puffery. The paper insisted that Stakhanov had used a number of helpers on support work, while the output was tallied for him alone. Stakhanov's approach had eventually led to the increased productivity by means of a better organization of the work, including specialization and task sequencing, according to the Soviet state media.

In fiction 
 Yuri Krymov's novel Tanker "Derbent", and an eponymous Soviet feature film based on the book, are about Stakhanovitism in oil transport across the Caspian Sea.
 Elio Petri's film The Working Class Goes to Heaven centered on a Stakhanovite.
 Andrzej Wajda's film Man of Marble explores the myth-making process behind a fictional Polish Stakhanovite, telling the story of his rise and eventual fall from grace.
 George Orwell's novel Animal Farm has a representation of the Stakhanovites in the character of Boxer the Horse, whose motto is "I will work harder!". 
 Harry Turtledove's novel "Fallout", from the Hot War trilogy, includes a character in eastern Russia who gets into trouble with local townspeople because he works hard like a Stakhanovite.
 Grigori Aleksandrov's film Tanya centered on a female character who becomes a member of the Stakhanovite movement.

See also

Notes

References

Works cited 

 
 
 
 
 
 
 
 

Soviet phraseology
Economic history of the Soviet Union
Labor history
Propaganda in the Soviet Union